Pedro Ignacio Domínguez Zepeda (born 9 September 1971) is a Mexican politician affiliated with the PRI. He currently serves as Deputy of the LXII Legislature of the Mexican Congress representing Chihuahua.

References

1971 births
Living people
People from Chihuahua City
Institutional Revolutionary Party politicians
21st-century Mexican politicians
Deputies of the LXII Legislature of Mexico
Members of the Chamber of Deputies (Mexico) for Chihuahua (state)